This is a list of United States ambassadors to Haiti.

See also
 Haiti – United States relations
 Foreign relations of Haiti
 Ambassadors of the United States

References

External links
 United States Department of State: Chiefs of Mission for Haiti
 United States Department of State: Haiti
 United States Embassy in Port-au-Prince
 United States Department of State: Background notes on Haiti

 01
United States
Haiti
Haiti